Rocky Mountain Laboratories (RML) is part of the NIH Intramural Research Program and is located in Hamilton, Montana. Operated by the National Institute of Allergy and Infectious Diseases, RML conducts research on maximum containment pathogens such as Ebola as well as research on prions and intracellular pathogens such as Coxiella burnetti and Francisella tularensis. RML operates one of the few Biosafety level 4 laboratories in the United States, as well as Biosafety level 3 and ABSL3/4 laboratories.

In February 2020, electron microscope images of SARS-CoV-2 were collected at RML.

History
Rocky Mountain Laboratories began as the Montana Board of Entomology Laboratory. It was opened in 1928 by the Montana State Board of Entomology to study Rocky Mountain spotted fever and the ticks, Dermacentor andersoni, that carry it. Local opposition to the "tick lab" was strong, as residents worried ticks would escape the laboratory and cause an outbreak in the community. To allay their fears, the original laboratory building featured a small moat around its perimeter. In 1932, after spotted fever was diagnosed in other states, the federal government bought the facility and renamed it Rocky Mountain Laboratory. The laboratory expanded, adding faculty to study zoonotic diseases including typhus, tularemia, and Q-fever.

During World War II, the United States Public Health Service used the laboratory to manufacture Yellow fever vaccine. When the human serum–base vaccine caused an outbreak of Hepatitis B that infected more than 350,000 U.S. soldiers, two researchers at the laboratory, Dr. Mason Hargett and Harry Burruss, developed an aqueous-base vaccine that combined distilled water with virus grown in chicken eggs. By the end of the war, the laboratory distributed more than 1 million doses of the improved yellow fever vaccine.

In the post-war decades, the laboratory broadened its scope to study chlamydia trachomatis and transmissible spongiform encephalopathies including scrapie, mad cow disease, and chronic wasting disease. In 1982, Dr. Willy Burgdorfer discovered Borrelia burgdorferi, the tick-borne bacterium that causes Lyme disease.

References

National Institute of Allergy and Infectious Diseases
Hamilton, Montana